Jimmy Dixon (born 10 October 1981) is a Liberian former footballer and current assistant coach for Swedish club Assyriska BK.

Career

Club career
Born in Tubmanburg, Dixon began his career with Mark Professionals before moving to Swedish side Floda BoIF in 2000. After two seasons, Dixon moved to BK Häcken, spending five seasons at the club and attracting attention from English club Arsenal. Dixon signed for Malmö FF in time for the 2007 season, on a three-year contract. In 2009, Dixon moved to Turkey, to sign for Manisaspor.

He re-joined BK Häcken in 2012, before signing for Turkish club Boluspor in January 2013.

International career
Dixon made his international debut in 1999, and has appeared in 10 FIFA World Cup qualifiers to date.

References

1981 births
Living people
People from Bomi County
Liberian footballers
Liberia international footballers
Liberian expatriate footballers
Mark Professionals FC players
Floda BoIF players
BK Häcken players
Malmö FF players
Manisaspor footballers
Allsvenskan players
Süper Lig players
2002 African Cup of Nations players
Expatriate footballers in Sweden
Expatriate footballers in Turkey
Liberian expatriate sportspeople in Sweden
Liberian expatriate sportspeople in Turkey
Association football defenders